The 2022–23 Gardner–Webb Runnin' Bulldogs women's basketball team represented Gardner–Webb University in the 2022–23 NCAA Division I women's basketball season. The Runnin' Bulldogs, led by fifth-year head coach Alex Simmons, played their home games at Paul Porter Arena in Boiling Springs, North Carolina as members of the Big South Conference.

Roster

Schedule and results
Sources

|-
!colspan=12 style=| Non-conference regular season

|-
!colspan=12 style=| Big South regular season

|-
!colspan=12 style=| Big South women's tournament

|-
!colspan=9 style=| NCAA Women's Tournament

See also
 2022–23 Gardner–Webb Runnin' Bulldogs men's basketball team

References

Gardner–Webb
Gardner–Webb Runnin' Bulldogs women's basketball seasons
Gardner–Webb Runnin' Bulldogs women's basketball team
Gardner–Webb Runnin' Bulldogs women's basketball team
Gardner–Webb